The Annie Larsen was a three-masted schooner that was involved in arms shipment in the so-called "Hindu German Conspiracy" during World War I.

Annie Larsen was built by the Hall Brothers in 1881. She was owned by James Tufts, of San Francisco, and later by Olson & Mahony and sailed in the coastwise lumber trade. In 1915, she was chartered to a shipbroker.

The ship came into the spotlight when it was seized on 25 June 1915 by US customs officials at Grays Harbor and found to be carrying large quantities of small arms and ammunitions in violation of the Neutrality Acts. The arms were meant to be transferred to the SS Maverick at a rendezvous off the coast of Mexico. The Annie Larsen affair was one of the major setbacks to the pro-Indian independence Ghadar Party, and was one of the major charges in the trial, one of the largest and most expensive in American legal history.

In 1918, Annie Larsen stranded on Malden Island.

See also
 Boka Star
 Chong Chon Gang
 MV Francop
 Victoria Affair

References

U.S. Customs at Grays Harbor seizes the schooner Annie Larsen loaded with arms and ammunition on June 29, 1915, Historylink.org

Further reading
 Includes a detailed account of the Annie Larsen affair by participant J.B. Starr-Hunt

Arms trafficking
Hindu–German Conspiracy
Lumber schooners
Maritime history of the United States
Merchant ships of the United States
Schooners of the United States
1881 ships
Ships built in Bainbridge Island, Washington
History of Grays Harbor County, Washington
India–United States military relations